The Brabantse Pijl is an elite women's professional one-day road bicycle race held in Belgium and is currently rated by the UCI as a 1.Pro race.

During the 2016 and 2017 seasons the race was known as the Pajot Hills Classic, however this was changed for the 2018 season (along with the events UCI rating) - aligning the event with that of the men's. It was then known as the Brabantse Pijl Dames Gooik, ending in Gooik. In 2022 however the race shifted to the same parcours as the men's race and ended in Overijse.

Past winners

Wins per country

References 

Cycle races in Belgium
Women's road bicycle races